Michael Tauson (born 25 June 1966 in Copenhagen) is a former tennis player from Denmark, who represented his native country at the 1988 Summer Olympics in Seoul. There he was defeated in the first round by the number five seed from the United States, Brad Gilbert. The right-hander reached his highest singles ATP-ranking on 5 March 1990, when he became the number 101 of the world. Michael Tauson is nowadays among other things,  working as Tennis commentator for Danish television; TV2 and TV2 Sport.

Personal life
His niece Clara Tauson is also a professional tennis player.

Challenger titles

Singles: (2)

Doubles: (1)

See also
List of Denmark Davis Cup team representatives

References

External links

1966 births
Danish male tennis players
Living people
Olympic tennis players of Denmark
Sportspeople from Copenhagen
Tennis players at the 1988 Summer Olympics